Jacob Nicholas House, also known as the Little Stone House Museum, is a historic home located at Easton, Northampton County, Pennsylvania.  It was built about 1750, and is a -story, three bay stone building. It has a rear frame clapboard addition built about 1840. It is built into an incline.

It was added to the National Register of Historic Places in 1976.

References

Houses on the National Register of Historic Places in Pennsylvania
Houses completed in 1750
Houses in Northampton County, Pennsylvania
National Register of Historic Places in Northampton County, Pennsylvania
Individually listed contributing properties to historic districts on the National Register in Pennsylvania